Miodrag Pantelić (born September 4, 1973) is a former Serbian football player.

Career
Pantelić begin playing for Sloboda Novi Kozarci, then was moved to Kikinda, and continued his career playing for Serbian Vojvodina and Red Star Belgrade, Bulgarian Levski Sofia and Chinese Dalian Shide and Beijing Guoan. He ended his career at the end of 2008-09 season.

International career
For the FR Yugoslavia national team, Pantelić was capped 4 times.

Honours

Player
Red Star Belgrade
First League of FR Yugoslavia: 1999–00
FR Yugoslavia Cup: 1995–96, 1996–97, 1998–99, 1999–00

Dalian Shide
Chinese Jia-A League/Chinese Super League: 2000, 2005
Chinese FA Cup: 2005

Levski Sofia 
Bulgarian First League: 2000–01, 2001–02
Bulgarian Cup: 2001–02

Manager
Zvijezda 09
First League of RS: 2017–18

References

External links
 Career story at Reprezentacija.rs
 

1973 births
Living people
Sportspeople from Kikinda
Serbian footballers
OFK Kikinda players
FK Vojvodina players
Red Star Belgrade footballers
Dalian Shide F.C. players
PFC Levski Sofia players
Beijing Guoan F.C. players
Chinese Super League players
Serbian SuperLiga players
First Professional Football League (Bulgaria) players
Expatriate footballers in China
Serbian expatriate sportspeople in China
Expatriate footballers in Bulgaria
Association football forwards
Serbian expatriate sportspeople in Bulgaria
Serbia and Montenegro international footballers
Serbian football managers
Expatriate football managers in Bosnia and Herzegovina
FK Zvijezda 09 managers